Toni Ketelä (born 16 March 1988) is a Finnish cross-country skier.

He represented Finland at the FIS Nordic World Ski Championships 2015 in Falun.

Cross-country skiing results
All results are sourced from the International Ski Federation (FIS).

World Championships

World Cup

Season standings

Individual podiums
 1 podium – (1 )

References

External links 
 

1988 births
Living people
Finnish male cross-country skiers